The 1959 NCAA Men's Ice Hockey Tournament was the culmination of the 1958–59 NCAA men's ice hockey season, the 12th such tournament in NCAA history. It was held between March 12 and 14, 1959, and concluded with North Dakota defeating Michigan State 4-3 in overtime. All games were played at the RPI Field House in Troy, New York.

This was the last tournament to be won by an independent school. (as of 2016)

Qualifying teams
Four teams qualified for the tournament, two each from the eastern and western regions. The Big Ten and Tri-State League champions received bids into the tournament as did two independent schools.

Format
The Tri-State League champion was seeded as the top eastern team while the Big Ten champion was given the top western seed. The second eastern seed was slotted to play the top western seed and vice versa. All games were played at the RPI Field House. All matches were Single-game eliminations with the semifinal winners advancing to the national championship game and the losers playing in a consolation game.

Bracket

Note: * denotes overtime period(s)

Semifinals

St. Lawrence vs. North Dakota

Michigan State vs. Boston College

Consolation Game

St. Lawrence vs. Boston College

National Championship

Michigan State vs. North Dakota

All-Tournament team

First Team
G: Joe Selinger (Michigan State)
D: Joe Jangro (Boston College)
D: Pat Presley (St. Lawrence)
F: Reg Morelli* (North Dakota)
F: Bill MacKenzie (Michigan State)
F: Ed Thomlinson (North Dakota)
* Most Outstanding Player(s)

Second Team
G: Jim Logue (Boston College)
D: Ralph Lyndon (North Dakota)
D: Ed Pollesel (Michigan State)
F: Larry Langill (St. Lawrence)
F: Tom Mustonen (Michigan State)
F: Joe Poole (North Dakota)

References

Tournament
NCAA Division I men's ice hockey tournament
NCAA Men's Ice Hockey Tournament
NCAA Men's Ice Hockey Tournament
Ice hockey competitions in New York (state)
Troy, New York
Sports in Rensselaer County, New York